Nebria elegans is a species of ground beetle in the Nebriinae subfamily that is endemic to Uttar Pradesh province of India.

References

elegans
Beetles described in 1925
Beetles of Asia
Endemic fauna of Uttar Pradesh